Michael Pope, was born and educated in England. He received B.A. and D.Phil. degrees from Oxford University. He can be considered as one of the leading and most influential polyoxometalate chemists worldwide. His 1983 book entitled “Heteropoly and Isopoly Oxometalates” is the most cited reference in the field (>5500 citations).

References

External links
  Pope Official Website
  Georgetown University - Faculty

Living people
American scientists
Year of birth missing (living people)